Ectoedemia acanthella is a moth of the family Nepticulidae. It was described by Wilkinson and Newton in 1981. It is known from New Jersey.

The wingspan is 7.2 mm.

References

Nepticulidae
Moths of North America
Moths described in 1981